Christopher Lungoyi (born 4 July 2000) is a footballer who plays as a forward for  club Ascoli, on loan from Juventus. Born in the Democratic Republic of the Congo, Lungoyi represents Switzerland internationally at youth level.

Club career
On 21 January 2021, Lungoyi joined Serie A side Juventus on a permanent deal; he was loaned back to Lugano for the remainder of the season.

On 14 January 2022, he was loaned to St. Gallen.

On 6 July 2022, Lungoyi was loaned to Ascoli with an option to buy.

Career statistics

References

2000 births
Living people
Footballers from Kinshasa
Swiss men's footballers
Switzerland youth international footballers
Democratic Republic of the Congo footballers
Democratic Republic of the Congo emigrants to Switzerland
Association football forwards
Swiss Challenge League players
Swiss Super League players
Servette FC players
FC Porto players
FC Porto B players
FC Lugano players
Juventus F.C. players
FC St. Gallen players
Ascoli Calcio 1898 F.C. players
Swiss expatriate footballers
Democratic Republic of the Congo expatriate footballers
Expatriate footballers in Portugal
Swiss expatriate sportspeople in Portugal
Democratic Republic of the Congo expatriate sportspeople in Portugal
Expatriate footballers in Italy
Swiss expatriate sportspeople in Italy
Democratic Republic of the Congo expatriate sportspeople in Italy
Switzerland under-21 international footballers